The Latin Grammy Award for Best Christian Album (Spanish Language) is an award for Latin Christian music given every year since the 5th Latin Grammy Awards ceremony, which took place at the Shrine Auditorium in Los Angeles. In 2002 and 2003 the category was named Best Christian Album and rewarded the Christian albums in Spanish and Portuguese. In 2004, the category was split into two depending on the language, with Portuguese language releases being awarded in the Best Christian Album (Portuguese Language) category ever since.

Since the creation of this category, Marcos Witt has been awarded the most out of any other artist, with six wins, followed by Alex Campos with five.

Winners and nominees

2000s

Best Christian Album

Best Christian Album (Spanish Language)

2010s

2020s

References

External links 
Official website of the Latin Grammy Awards

 
Christian Album (Spanish Language)